Charles de Lambert may refer to:

Count Charles de Lambert (aviator) (1865–1944), early French aviator
Count Charles de Lambert (soldier) (1773-1843), Russian Major General during the Napoleonic Wars
Karl Lambert (1815–1865), Russian General of Cavalry

See also
Charles Lambert (disambiguation)